O'Grady v Sparling was a landmark Supreme Court of Canada decision on the constitutionality of overlapping federal and provincial laws. The Court held that there was no conflict between federal dangerous driving offences, which only prohibited "advertent" negligence and provincial careless driving offences, which included "inadvertent" negligence. The analysis used here is also known as the paramountcy doctrine.

Background
The defendant was charged under section 55(1) of Manitoba's Highway Traffic Act which prohibited driving “on a highway without due care and attention or without reasonable consideration for other persons using the highway”. The defendant challenged the law, claiming that it was beyond the power of the province because the federal government had “occupied the field” with a similar criminal provision in the Criminal Code, which prohibited driving with "wanton or reckless disregard for the lives or safety of other persons."

The issue before the Court was whether provincial laws relating to negligence with penal consequences would necessarily be a criminal law and thus encroach on federal jurisdiction.

Opinion of the Court
The opinion of the Court was written by Judson J.,  with Kerwin, Taschereau, Fauteux, Abbott, Martland, and Ritchie concurring.

Judson held that “the power of a provincial legislature to enact legislation for the regulation of highway traffic is undoubted”. He reaffirmed the principle that there exists a "general area" or "domain" of criminal law. Thus the two governments can make law on the same matter by creating a distinction between the types of culpability:

On the facts, Judson found that there was overlap between the laws however “there is no conflict between these provisions in the sense that they are repugnant”. The provincial law extended to include “inadvertent negligence” as well as regular negligence. It was enough that “the two pieces of legislation differed both in legislative purpose and legal and practical effect” to justify both of them.

Dissent
Cartwright and Locke JJ., in dissent, held that there is no possibility of overlapping domains. He stated that the leading case on the matter, ‘’Provincial Secretary of Prince Edward Island v. Egan’’, cannot be read so broadly as to give the provinces unlimited powers over highways. Matters in relation to those within the federal government's powers are exclusive and comprehensive and do not allow for complementary law:

On the facts, he found that there was no difference between the provincial Act and the provision in the Criminal Code which occupies a domain exclusive to the federal government.

See also
 List of Supreme Court of Canada cases (Richards Court through Fauteux Court)

References

Canadian federalism case law
Supreme Court of Canada cases
1960 in Canadian case law